Alexander Wadsworth Longfellow Jr. (August 18, 1854, Portland, Maine – February 16, 1934, Portland) was an American architect and nephew of poet Henry Wadsworth Longfellow.

Biography
Alexander Wadsworth Longfellow Jr. was the son of Alexander Wadsworth Longfellow Sr. (1814–1901), a U.S. Coast Survey topographer, and the former Elizabeth Clapp Porter.  After graduating from Harvard University in 1876, he studied architecture at the Massachusetts Institute of Technology and the École des Beaux-Arts in Paris, then worked as senior draftsman in Henry Hobson Richardson's office.

Career
After Richardson's death in 1886, Longfellow teamed up with Frank Ellis Alden (1859–1908) and Alfred Branch Harlow (1857–1927) to found the firm of Longfellow, Alden & Harlow, with offices in Boston and Pittsburgh. The firm designed the Carnegie Library of Pittsburgh and the City Hall in Cambridge, Massachusetts. They also designed the Arnold Arboretum headquarters, the Hunnewell Building, in 1892 which was constructed with funds donated by philanthropist-horticulturalist Horatio Hollis Hunnewell in 1903.

Longfellow later moved to Boston, where he worked in association with his cousin, William Pitt Preble Longfellow (1836–1913). He designed several structures around Harvard, including the Brattle Theatre, the Phillips Brooks House, the Semitic Museum, the Bertram and Eliot Halls at Radcliffe College, and chemical laboratories.

He also designed the Washington Street Elevated, the Theodore Parker Church in West Roxbury, the Merrill Memorial Library in Yarmouth, ME, the Curtis Memorial Library in Brunswick, ME and a Maine Historical Society library building. He served on the board of directors of the Dedham Pottery company and designed their plant.

Longfellow also designed and built Eliestoun, a large shingle-style summer home, rare in the midwest. Eliestoun was completed in 1890 and is on the Principia College campus in Elsah, Illinois.

Works

Interests
Longfellow was one of the founders of The Society of Arts and Crafts of Boston, active in the Boston Marine Museum, and a trustee of the Boston Museum of Fine Arts and the Boston Athenæum.

References

Bibliography
 Margaret Henderson Floyd, "Architecture after Richardson: Regionalism before Modernism--Longfellow, Alden, and Harlow in Boston and Pittsburgh", University of Chicago Press (1994).

External links

"Alden & Harlow Collection", at Carnegie Mellon University
"Longfellow Family Architects", at the Longfellow House–Washington's Headquarters National Historic Site
Friends of Eliestoun website

1854 births
1934 deaths
Harvard University alumni
MIT School of Architecture and Planning alumni
Architects from Boston
Architects from Portland, Maine